Events from the year 1596 in India.

Events
 The Church of Our Lady of Salvation, or the Portuguese Church is established in Dadar, Mumbai

Births
 Sunderdas, poet and social reformer (born 1596)

Deaths
 Madhavdev, author and poet dies in Bhela Sattra (born 1489)

See also
 Timeline of Indian history

 
India